Zynoviy Kovalyk ( – sometimes spelled Zenon or Zenobius; 18 August 1903 - ? 1941) was a Ukrainian Greek Catholic priest and martyr.

Family background

Zynoviy Kovalyk was born in the village of Ivachiv Dolishniy, near Ternopil in Austrian Galicia (western Ukraine). His family were peasant workers and, like many of that time and place, were devout Christians. Perhaps it was due to his family's devotion that Zynoviy developed a vocation to the Catholic priesthood while he was still young. He was known to have a good singing voice and a joyful temperament, and also to be a person of strong character.

Ministry as a Redemptorist

After teaching in a primary school for a short period of time, he entered the novitiate of the Redemptorists (Congregation of the Holy Redeemer) when he was 25, which made him older than most novices of that period; he made his first religious profession on 26 August 1926.

After the novitiate he studied philosophy and theology in Belgium. He returned to Ukraine and was ordained a priest on 9 August 1932, celebrating his first Liturgy in his village of Ivachiv on 4 September 1932.

Kovalyk then travelled with Bishop Nicholas Charnetsky (who was also to become a martyr) to Volhynia to work amongst the Ukrainians of the Eastern Orthodox Church in order to promote ecumenism. Kovalyk was a good singer and a preacher. It is said he had a golden mouth, and that his preaching drew thousands of people and led them to a greater devotion to Jesus and Mary. After several years he went to Stanislaviv (today Ivano-Frankivsk) to take up the post of provincial bursar, while being also very engaged in the traditional Redemptorist practice of conducting missions throughout the area.

Immediately before the Soviet invasion of 1939 he travelled to the Redemptorist monastery in Lviv and assumed the position of bursar. Due to the Communist presence many clergy concentrated on spiritual matters when they gave a homily and avoided issues of freedom and justice. As a preacher, Kovalyk showed no reluctance to publicly condemn the ideology and atheistic customs then being introduced by the Soviets, and to preach on matters affecting the everyday lives of the people. Even though he was warned by his friends that the Communist authorities were suspicious of him and that he should be less vocal, he is said to have replied, "If it is God's will, I am ready to die, but I cannot be quiet in the face of such injustice." On the feast of the Dormition of the Mother of God, 15 August 1940, he gave a homily which reportedly drew some ten thousand faithful.

Arrest and death

On 20 December 1940, the Soviet secret police took Kovalyk from his monastery on account of the sermon he had preached on the Feast of the Immaculate Conception (8 December). He was accused of being a spy. For the six months of his incarceration at Brygidki prison, like many others, he was subjected to interrogation and torture. In prison, he continued his ministry by praying with the other prisoners, hearing confessions, giving spiritual exercises, teaching catechism classes, and comforting them with religious tales and stories from the Bible.

On 22 June 1941, German troops began their offensive against the Soviet Union and the city of Lviv fell seven days later. As the German army advanced, the Soviets guards executed 7,000 prisoners prior to retreat. Witnesses claim that, rather than simply shooting Kovalyk, he was crucified on a corridor wall of the prison, his stomach ripped open and a dead human foetus inserted. Official Soviet statements claim that Kovalyk was shot and not crucified.

On 24 April 2001, along with several other Redemptorists, Kovalyk was recognised by the Holy See as being a martyr. He was beatified by Pope John Paul II on 27 June 2001 during that pope's pastoral visit to Ukraine. June 27 is the feast of Our Lady of Perpetual Help, the patroness of the Redemptorists.

Legacy 
In his memoirs, Yaroslav Levytskyi recounts Kovalyk's sermons and the risk they invoked. '[His] sermons made an incredible impression on his listeners. But in the prevailing system of denunciations and terror this was very dangerous for a preacher. So I often tried to convince Father Kovalyk... that [he] needed to be more careful about the content of his sermons, that he shouldn't provoke the Bolsheviks, because here was a question of his own safety. But it was all in vain. Fathey Kovalyk only had one answer:"If that is god's will, I will gladly accept death, but as a preacher I will never act against my conscience."'

References

Other sources
Biographies of twenty five Greek-Catholic Servants of God at the website of the Vatican
Beatification of the Servants of God on June 27, 2001 at the website of the Ukrainian Greek Catholic Church
Francisco Radecki. Tumultuous Times: The Twenty General Councils of the Catholic Church and Vatican II and Its Aftermath. St. Joseph's Media, 2004.
Blessed Zenon Kovalyk Patron Saints Index.
German language biography * 

1903 births
1941 deaths
People from Ternopil Oblast
People from the Kingdom of Galicia and Lodomeria
Members of the Ukrainian Greek Catholic Church
Ukrainian beatified people
Ukrainian people executed by the Soviet Union
Executed Ukrainian people
Religious persecution by communists
Catholic people executed by the Soviet Union
Beatified Redemptorists